Langsford is a surname. Notable people with the surname include:

 Bob Langsford (1865–1907), baseball player
 Don Langsford (born 1959), Australian rules footballer
 Joseph Langsford (1865–1957), Australian businessman and politician
 Ruth Langsford (born 1960), English television presenter

See also
 Gow Langsford Gallery, art gallery in Auckland, New Zealand